Miao Miao (born 29 November 1988), also known by her stage name Vivi Miao, is a Chinese actress. She made her acting debut in the TV drama Who Is Lying  (2007), and has since gone on to appear in numerous film titles such as 
Youth (2017) and The Best Is Yet to Come (2020).

Early life
Miao was born on 1988 in the city of Nanyang in Henan Province, and also grew up there. She started dancing at the age of six and in 1999, she entered the High School Affiliated to Beijing Dance Academy, where she majored in Chinese dance. In 2005, she was admitted to the Beijing Dance Academy, where she graduated in 2009 with a major in classical dance.

Career
 
In 2007, Miao made her acting debut in the Chinese TV drama Who Is Lying, where she played the role of Yi Chuchu. In 2008, she starred in the war drama Proof of Identity, which was directed by Mao Weining.

In 2009, following her graduation from the Beijing Dance Academy, Miao was selected as a dancer by the General Political Song and Dance Troupe
in the People's Liberation Army. On the same year, she participated in the Shanxi Rap Stage, one of the important repertoires of the Central Propaganda Department and the Ministry of Culture of China, during the 60th anniversary of the founding of the People's Republic of China. She participated in the play Liberation and toured with the cast to various theaters for the play's performance. In 2013, for her performance in the play  Railway Guerrilla, Miao received the silver award at the 9th Lotus Cup Dance, Drama and Poetry Performance.

In 2017, she starred in the TV drama The Peach Blossom, where she played the role of Tao Rui. On the same year, she starred in the film Youth, which was directed by Feng Xiaogang and written by Yan Geling. In the film, she played the role of 
He Xiaoping, a member of the People's Liberation Army Art Troupe. For her performance in the film, Miao received the Best Newcomer Awards at the 25th Beijing College Student, Chinese (Ningbo·Cixi) and Faroe Island Film Festivals.

In 2018, it was announced that she would star in the suspense drama film June, alongside Aaron Kwok. Directed by Wang Yang, the movie talks about an aspiring cellist who grows up in New York's Chinatown and her life being turned upside-down when she discovers a secret about her father. On 23 August 2019, she took part as a guest in the cultural experience program Meet the Temple of Heaven. From 2019 to 2020, she starred as a main character in the TV drama Unstoppable Youth. From 2020, she is currently starring in the TV drama If There Is No Tomorrow, which is broadcast on Chinese OTT platforms iQIYI, Tencent Video and Youku.

On 28 May 2021, she participated in the fifth season of Chinese variety show Keep Running, a spin-off from the popular original South Korean variety show Running Man.

Personal life
In June 2018, Miao was invited to serve as the Ocean Public Welfare Ambassador on World Ocean Day and on 2019, she was made an ambassador of Serbian tourism in China. In July 2021, she donated CN¥ 1.5 million for the victims of 2021 Henan floods.

On 21 May 2020, Miao announced that she married actor Zheng Kai and on October 23, she gave birth to her daughter.On 21 April 2022, Miao announced that she was pregnant with her second child. On 1 June 2022, she gave birth to her son.

Filmography

Films

Television

References

External links
 
 

1988 births
Living people
Actresses from Henan
Chinese film actresses
Chinese television actresses
Chinese stage actresses
Chinese female dancers
21st-century Chinese actresses
Beijing Dance Academy alumni
People from Nanyang, Henan